Joana Palacios (born 8 November 1996) is an Argentine weightlifter. She competed in the women's 63 kg event at the 2016 Summer Olympics.

References

External links
 

1996 births
Living people
Argentine female weightlifters
Olympic weightlifters of Argentina
Weightlifters at the 2016 Summer Olympics
Place of birth missing (living people)
South American Games bronze medalists for Argentina
South American Games medalists in weightlifting
Competitors at the 2018 South American Games
21st-century Argentine women